Piotr Bajdziak  (born 4 May 1984 in Łódź) is a Polish footballer (midfielder) playing currently for Czarni Żagań. Bajdziak played in Sweden for Sandvikens IF and Östersunds FK and later in Ireland for Sligo Rovers F.C., before returning to Poland in 2008. Piotr Bajdziak is now being tested by the Dutch Second Division club FC Emmen.

References

External links
 

1984 births
Living people
Sportspeople from Łódź
Polish footballers
Association football midfielders
Unia Janikowo players
RKS Radomsko players
Polish expatriate footballers
Expatriate footballers in Sweden
Sandvikens IF players
Polish expatriate sportspeople in Sweden
Östersunds FK players
Stal Głowno players
Expatriate association footballers in the Republic of Ireland
League of Ireland players
Sligo Rovers F.C. players
Polish expatriate sportspeople in Ireland
Odra Opole players
Czarni Żagań players